This article presents in a tabular form the career tennis Grand Slam, World Hard Court Championships and Olympic singles results of every woman who has reached the singles final of at least one Grand Slam, World Hard Court Championships or Olympic tournament (OLY) during her career.  The Grand Slam tournaments are the Australian Open (AUS), the French Open (FRA), Wimbledon (WIM), and the US Open (USA).

This article is a compilation of the performance timelines that are included in the numerous Wikipedia articles covering individual tennis players, such as Helen Wills Moody, Billie Jean King, Margaret Court, Chris Evert and Martina Navratilova. This article facilitates the comparison of the career Grand Slam, World Hard Court Championships and Olympic singles results of each player, particularly of women who were playing at the same time.

This article is split into two sections, 1884–1977 and 1978–present, for ease of navigation.

Key to table entries 

The loser in the bronze medal match receives the normal semifinal entry shown above. The rest of the Olympic entries follow the standard key based on their progression through the tournament.

Refer to the notes below each table for an explanation of more tabular entries that are used infrequently in these tables.

1884–1900

1901–1912

Notes:

 ACF = lost in the all comers final (the winner played the defending champion).
 Through 1923, the French Championships were open only to French nationals. The World Hard Court Championships, actually played on clay in Paris or Brussels, began in 1912 and were open to all nationalities. Though not a slam, many major players participated and the results from that tournament are shown here for 1912.
 The results from the outdoor version of the tennis competition at the 1908 and 1912 Olympic Games are shown here.

1913–1921

1922–1928

Notes:

 Through 1923, the French Championships were open only to French nationals. The World Hard Court Championships (WHCC), actually played on clay in Paris or Brussels, began in 1912 and were open to all nationalities. The results from that tournament are shown here for 1922 and 1923. The Olympics replaced the WHCC in 1924, as the Olympics were held in Paris. Beginning in 1925, the French Championships were open to all nationalities, with the results shown here beginning with that year.

1929–1935

1936–1942

Notes:

 R = tournament restricted to French nationals and held under German occupation

1943–1949

Notes:

 R = tournament restricted to French nationals and held under German occupation

1950–1956

1957–1963

1964–1970

1971–1977

Notes:

 The Australian Open was held twice in 1977, in January (J) and December (D).

1978–present

See also

Tennis performance timeline comparison (men)

References

Women's tennis
p